
Gmina Książki is a rural gmina (administrative district) in Wąbrzeźno County, Kuyavian-Pomeranian Voivodeship, in north-central Poland.

Villages
Gmina Książki contains the villages and settlements of Blizienko, Blizno, Brudzawki, Książki, Łopatki, Osieczek, Szczuplinki and Zaskocz.

Neighbouring gminas
Gmina Książki is bordered by the gminas of Bobrowo, Dębowa Łąka, Jabłonowo Pomorskie, Radzyń Chełmiński, Świecie nad Osą and Wąbrzeźno.

References
Polish official population figures 2006

Ksiazki
Wąbrzeźno County